The Central Kowloon Route (CKR) is a highway project under construction in Kowloon, Hong Kong. When completed in 2025, it will form the section of the planned Route 6 which runs through the Kowloon Peninsula, largely underground. The three-lane dual carriageway would begin at the Yau Ma Tei interchange of the West Kowloon Highway and finish at a new interchange in the Kai Tak Development. From there, Route 6 is planned to continue to Tseung Kwan O, although the section beyond Kai Tak is not part of the CKR project.

Between Yau Ma Tei and Kai Tak, there are no intermediate interchanges. The proposed alignment will lead to the demolition of numerous structures including the Yau Ma Tei Car Park Building, a public library, the jade hawker bazaar, and the Yau Ma Tei Specialist Clinic Extension.

In January 2016, the Hong Kong Executive Council approved construction of the Central Kowloon Route. The project was commenced in the 4th quarter of 2017.

In October 2020, a construction accident occurred. An excavator being lifted by a tower crane broke loose and plunged down a giant ventilation shaft in Ho Man Tin. Nobody was injured.

References

External links

 
 Page at Highways Department website
 Project profile

Proposed transport infrastructure in Hong Kong
Route 6 (Hong Kong)
Undersea tunnels in Asia
Roads in Kowloon
Roads in New Kowloon